Jean-Philippe Dojwa (born 7 August 1967 in Elbeuf) is a French former cyclist. He finished fifteenth in the 1993 Tour de France.

Major results
1992
1st Côte Picarde
1st Tour de Luxembourg

Grand Tour results

Tour de France
1993: 15th
1994: DNF
1997: DNF

Vuelta a España
1991: DNF

References

1967 births
Living people
French male cyclists